The Wallace Blake House is a historic house in St. George, Utah, United States, that is listed on the National Register of Historic Places (NRHP).

Description
The house is located at 980 Manzanita Road and was built in 1908 by stonemason Dode Wiethen and carpenter Brigham Carpenter. It was built with stones from the 1876 Price City LDS chapel. At the time of construction, it was located within Bloomington, a former community that was originally separate from, but is now part of the City of St. George.  

It was listed on the NRHP November 14, 1978.

See also

 National Register of Historic Places listings in Washington County, Utah

References

External links

National Register of Historic Places in Washington County, Utah
Houses completed in 1908
1908 establishments in Utah